Beaufortia eriocephala, commonly known as woolly bottlebrush or woolly beaufortia, is a species of flowering plant in the myrtle family, Myrtaceae and is endemic to the southwest of Western Australia.

Description
The leaves are hairy but become glabrous with age.

The flowers are arranged in almost spherical heads on the ends of branches which continue to grow after flowering. The flowers have 5 sepals, 5 petals and 5 bundles of stamens.

Taxonomy and naming
Melaleuca eriocephala was first formally described in 1905 by the Australian botanist, William Vincent Fitzgerald in Journal of the West Australian Natural History Society. The specific epithet ("eriocephala") is from the Ancient Greek ἔριον (érion) meaning "wool" and  κεφαλή (kephalḗ) meaning "head".

Distribution and habitat
Beaufortia eriocephala occurs in the Avon Wheatbelt, Geraldton Sandplains, Jarrah Forest and Swan Coastal Plain bioregions in the south-west of Western Australia. It grows on slopes in sandy soils derived from laterite.

Conservation
Beaufortia eriocephala is classified as "Priority Three" by the Western Australian Government Department of Biodiversity, Conservation and Attractions, meaning that it is poorly known and known from only a few locations but is not under imminent threat.

References

eriocephala
Plants described in 1905
Endemic flora of Western Australia
Taxa named by William Vincent Fitzgerald